Triple P may refer to:

 Triple P (album), a 2005 album by Platinum Pied Pipers
 Triple P (parenting program), a parenting-skills program
 Pascal Perrault (born 1959), nicknamed Triple P, French professional poker player
 Patton Plame, nicknamed Triple P, a fictional character in the TV series NCIS: New Orleans

See also
 PPP (disambiguation)